Ethmia cupreonivella is a moth in the family Depressariidae. It is found in Brazil.

The ground color of the forewings is glossy cupreous violet with large shining snow-white spots and blotches. The ground color of the hindwings is pale grayish brown, rather whitish, not quite transparent towards the base.

References

Moths described in 1973
cupreonivella